Rushcliffe Borough Council elections are held every four years. Rushcliffe Borough Council is the local authority for the non-metropolitan district of Rushcliffe in Nottinghamshire, England. Since the last boundary changes in 2015, 44 councillors have been elected from 25 wards.

Political control
The first election to the council was held in 1973, initially operating as a shadow authority before coming into its powers on 1 April 1974. Since 1973 political control of the council has been held by the following parties:

Leadership
The leaders of the council since 2005 have been:

Council elections
1973 Rushcliffe Borough Council election
1976 Rushcliffe Borough Council election (New ward boundaries)
1979 Rushcliffe Borough Council election
1983 Rushcliffe Borough Council election
1987 Rushcliffe Borough Council election (Borough boundary changes took place but the number of seats remained the same)
1991 Rushcliffe Borough Council election (Borough boundary changes took place but the number of seats remained the same)
1995 Rushcliffe Borough Council election
1999 Rushcliffe Borough Council election
2003 Rushcliffe Borough Council election (New ward boundaries reduced the number of seats by four)
2007 Rushcliffe Borough Council election
2011 Rushcliffe Borough Council election
2015 Rushcliffe Borough Council election (New ward boundaries)
2019 Rushcliffe Borough Council election

By-election results

1995-1999

1999-2003

2003-2007

2007-2011

References

By-election results

External links
Rushcliffe Borough Council

 
Rushcliffe
Council elections in Nottinghamshire
District council elections in England